Harmony, Ontario can refer to:

Harmony, Perth County, Ontario
Harmony, Stormont, Dundas and Glengarry United Counties, Ontario
Harmony, St. Joseph, Ontario
Harmony Bay, Unorganized North Algoma District